Buellia disciformis, the boreal button lichen, is a thin, bluish to pale gray rimose to areolate crustose lichen that grows on bark (rarely also on wood) in temperate forests in the northern USA and Europe, and at high altitudes in Arizona, down to  in coastal  areas of California.
 Flat apothecia with black discs are .2-.7 mm in diameter and sessile (neither raised or immersed in the thallus), with noticeable lecideine margins. Lichen spot tests are negative except for K+ yellow. Secondary metabolites include atranorin, fulgidin, and sometimes traces of fulgoicin and norfulgoicin. B. erubescens is similar and more often found on wood than the bark loving B. disciformis, and has smaller spores.

See also
List of Buellia species

References

disciformis
Lichen species
Lichens described in 1826
Lichens of North America
Lichens of Europe
Taxa named by Elias Magnus Fries